Manfred Stefes (born 28 March 1967) is a former German footballer who played as a defender and currently the assistant coach of Borussia Dortmund.

References

1967 births
Borussia Mönchengladbach managers
Borussia Mönchengladbach players
Fortuna Düsseldorf players
MSV Duisburg managers
People from Rhein-Kreis Neuss
Sportspeople from Düsseldorf (region)
Living people
German footballers
Association football defenders
Footballers from North Rhine-Westphalia
German football managers
Borussia Dortmund non-playing staff
Borussia Mönchengladbach non-playing staff
Association football coaches